C.C. Burr (1891–1956) was an American film producer of the silent and early sound eras.  He also directed eleven short films. Originally an employee at Paramount Pictures, he branched out into independent production working with a number of different distributors over two decades.

Selected filmography

 The Silent Barrier (1920)
 Burn 'Em Up Barnes (1921)
 I Am the Law (1922)
 Sure Fire Flint (1922)
 The Secrets of Paris (1922)
 The Last Hour (1923)
 Luck (1923)
 Three O'Clock in the Morning (1923)
 You Are Guilty (1923)
 The Average Woman (1924)
 Restless Wives (1924)
 The Speed Spook (1924)
 The New School Teacher (1924)
 Youth for Sale (1924)
 Lend Me Your Husband (1924)
 The Crackerjack (1925)
 The Live Wire (1925)
 The Early Bird (1925)
 The Brown Derby (1926)
 Rainbow Riley (1926)
 Stepping Along (1926)
 White Pants Willie (1927)
 All Aboard (1927)
 Home Made (1927)
 Dreary House (1928)
 Chinatown Charlie (1928)
 The Wright Idea (1928)
 Call of the Circus (1930)
 Western Limited (1932)
 The Midnight Patrol (1932)
 Money Means Nothing (1934)
 The Moth (1934)
 Kentucky Blue Streak (1935)
 Rip Roaring Riley (1935)
 Suicide Squad (1935)
 Skybound (1935)
 I'll Name the Murderer (1936)
 The Reckless Way (1936)
 Special Agent K-7 (1937)
 In Old Montana (1939)
 Code of the Fearless (1939)
 Two Gun Troubador (1939)
 Ridin' the Trail (1940)

References

Bibliography
 Koszarski, Richard. Hollywood on the Hudson: Film and Television in New York from Griffith to Sarnoff. Rutgers University Press, 2008.
 Pokorny, Michael & Sedgwick, John. An Economic History of Film. Routledge,  2004.

External links

1891 births
1956 deaths
American film producers
American film directors
People from Brooklyn